Hillbilly Jedi is the fourth studio album by American country music duo Big & Rich, released on September 18, 2012.  It is the duo's first new studio album since Between Raising Hell and Amazing Grace in 2007.  The album's lead-off single, "That's Why I Pray," was released on May 21, 2012 and was followed by two more singles, "Party Like Cowboyz" and "Cheat On You."  Hillbilly Jedi received mixed reviews from critics.

Overview
In 2008, just a year after the duo released Between Raising Hell and Amazing Grace, John Rich announced that the duo would be going on hiatus so that Big Kenny could recuperate from an old injury.  Both members released solo songs during this period before reuniting in mid-2011 to release the single "Fake ID" for the Footloose soundtrack and began to tour.  Later that year, the duo announced plans for a new album.  Shortly after the release of "That's Why I Pray," Rich went on record as saying that he felt that the song could be the biggest of the duo's career.

Alphin said that the album's title "came out in a writing session we were doing with Richie Sambora and Jon Bon Jovi the other week.  They are going to record the song on our new album and a line in the song was "hillbilly jedis with attitude." All of a sudden, Bon Jovi stops and says, "Hillbilly Jedis? That’s it. I’d buy that shirt." We were like, "Hey, that’s about a descriptive as you can get of what we are.""  Bon Jovi was instrumental in securing the album's title, even going so far as to call George Lucas to ask for permission once the group realized that the word "jedi" was copyrighted.

Critical reception
Reviews for Hillbilly Jedi have generally been mixed.  Stephen Thomas Erlewine of Allmusic ended his review by stating "Hillbilly Jedi merely raises one question: weren't Big & Rich better off following their own paths?"  In his review for Slant Magazine, Jonathan Keefe mentioned that "the only thing noteworthy about the album is that George Lucas allowed Big & Rich to refer to themselves as Jedis" while Rob Burkhardt, in a similarly negative review, mentioned that the album is "just a recycling of an old schtick, a feeble attempt to revive a party everyone already went home from. And it doesn’t go over well."

Country-focused reviewers have been much more positive.  Daryl Addison, in his review for GAC, stated that "on Hillbilly Jedi, the duo is back with a masterful set that is refreshed, renewed and re-focused. Just like they announced on their debut, it’s a celebration of music and it’s great to have them back."  Echoing the tone of the former, Country Music Rocks stated that "There is something for everyone on Hillbilly Jedi" while Dan MacIntosh of Country Standard Time similarly stated that "This album is truly good, and that's no Jedi mind trick."  Joseph Hudak was positive in his review for Country Weekly, declaring that "Hillbilly Jedi stands as Big & Rich’s strongest and most inspired album since Horse of a Different Color. Entertained Yoda would be."  In his modestly positive review for Roughstock, Marc Erickson stated that "if you've never been a fan of their music, chances are you will not become one now as the Hillbilly Jedi are leading a freak parade that never was meant to be 100% wholly mainstream."

Commercial performance
"That's Why I Pray" debuted at number 24 on the Country charts, the highest debut achieved by a duo since the charts were first tabulated by Nielsen BDS in 1990.  The album sold about 17,000 copies in its first week.

Track listing

Personnel
Big and Rich
 Big Kenny – vocals, hi-string acoustic guitar
 John Rich – vocals

Additional Musicians

 Jon Bon Jovi – vocals on "Born Again"
 Tom Bukovac – electric guitar, soloist
 Nicole Burt – choir
 Sarah Buxton – background vocals
 J.T. Corenflos – electric guitar
 Cowboy Troy – rap on "Rock the Boat" and "Get Your Game On"
 Eric Darken – percussion
 Paul Franklin – steel guitar
 Althea Layne Hamilton – choir
 Steve Hermann – trumpet
 Mark Hill – bass guitar
 Jim Hinchey – trombone
 Jim Hoke – clarinet, harmonica
 Dann Huff – bouzouki, dobro, electric guitar, keyboards, mandolin, slide guitar, soloist, synthesizer
 Charlie Judge – keyboards, piano, upright piano, string pads, strings, synthesizer

 Chris McHugh – drums
 Matt Menefee – banjo
 Garrett Miller – acoustic guitar
 Greg Morrow – drums, percussion
 Megan Mullins – background vocals
 Danny Rader – banjo, bouzouki, acoustic guitar
 Richie Sambora – electric guitar, soloist, and background vocals on "Born Again"
 Adam Shoenfeld – acoustic guitar, electric guitar, soloist
 Jimmie Lee Sloas – bass guitar
 Christopher C. Smith – choir
 Russell Terrell – background vocals
 Ilya Toshinsky – acoustic guitar, electric guitar
 Jonathan Yudkin – cello, fiddle, mandolin, string arrangements, strings, violin, viola

Chart performance

Album

Singles

References

2012 albums
Big & Rich albums
Warner Records albums
Albums produced by Dann Huff